The Harley-Davidson Twin Cam are motorcycle engines made by Harley-Davidson from 1998 to 2017. Although these engines differed significantly from the Evolution engine, which in turn was derived from the series of single camshaft, overhead valve motors that were first released in 1936, they share a number of characteristics with nearly all previous Harley-Davidson engines. Both engines have two cylinders in a V-twin configuration at 45°, are air-cooled (some touring models use liquid cooling for the heads), and activate valves with push-rods. The crankshafts have a single pin with a knife and fork arrangement for the connecting rods. These are sandwiched between a pair of flywheels.

The Twin Cam 88 was a traditional design from Harley-Davidson, using two cams to drive the valvetrain, with the first being the famous '8-Valve' OHV V-twin racing models of 1915. Their 1920s single-cylinder models (the A, AA, BA, BB, and Peashooter) also used twin camshafts in the timing chest, and did their 1930s flathead engine models, like the VL and UL Big Twins, and the entire range of 45ci (750cc) V-twins from 1930 onwards: the Models D and W and their variants, such as the WLA military motorcycle and WR racing motorcycle.

The Twin Cam 88 was released for the 1999 model year in September 1998. The Twin Cam 96 was released for the 2007 model year.

88B and 96B Engines

The Twin Cam initially was not used in the Softail model family before the year 2000. This was due to the chassis design and vibration transfer to the Softail frame as a result of the direct (hard) mounting of the engine. Dyna models are "rubber mounted", damping the majority of vibration transfer to the frame and rider. Another reason was that the engine and transmission on a Twin Cam are directly bolted (but are still separate units) to each other, with the chassis seat post on a Softail getting in the way of a Twin Cam transmission case. As the company determined that a rubber-mounted Softail would affect the line's visual styling, Harley solved the issue by designing an engine variant known as Twin Cam 88B. It is basically the same engine as the original (now retroactively referred to by enthusiasts as "Twin Cam 88A"), but with a modified engine block design that incorporates twin chain-driven balance shafts. The Twin Cam 96B engine was released at the same time as the Twin Cam 96A model, for the 2007 model year, and was equipped on all Softail models until it was replaced by the 103 ci version.

It is however possible to mount a regular Twin Cam motor to a pre-2000 Softail (or any chassis that accepts an Evolution engine) through third-party adapters.

Differences from predecessor (Evolution engine)
The engine design differed considerably from its predecessor the "Evo" although it shared some design elements with the Sportster line. The 88 represents the displacement in cubic inches of the standard engine. The Twin Cam 95 was introduced with the Screamin' Eagle (Later known as CVO) Models and ran until the 88 was discontinued after 2006. The Twin Cam 95 displaces . The Twin Cam 96 displaces .

Development
Development of the Twin Cam started in the early 1990s, as Harley sought to address problems affecting the previous Evolution engine, particularly structural weaknesses within the crankcase, oil circulation and leakages. While aftermarket firms such as S&S Cycle previously responded with stronger crankcase components for high-performance Evolutions, Harley went for a completely new design, while keeping the engine fundamentally and aesthetically similar to the traditional 45-degree, air-cooled overhead valve V-twin.

The Twin Cam only shared 18 parts with its predecessor, as almost all of the components were unique to the engine. As the name implies, the engine uses two chain-driven cams, to comply with EPA noise regulations. The drivetrain was reinforced through a mounting scheme called the "Revised Rear Interface", allowing the transmission case to be mounted directly to the rear of the engine, with the primary drive and clutch covers playing less of a structural role; this was also partly the reason for Softails not initially receiving a Twin Cam for the 1999 model year.

The early prototype Twin Cam engines had considerable trouble with the oiling system. These problems delayed release of the engine as scheduled for the 1997 model year. When the engines were run, oil came out any gasketed joint as well as the breather. Harley sought the help of Paul Troxler, a young engineer from Southwest Research Institute and eventually the problem was traced to a design which drained the cam case into the crankcase, and used a single scavenge pump. Due to airflow through ports in the crankcase wall, the cam case was not draining properly. After much testing, the solution was to seal the cam case from the crankcase and use a dual scavenge system, which was incorporated into the engine, rather than as an outboard pump as used on older Big Twins since the original Knucklehead. However, oil was still not scavenging properly from the crankcase, and this was traced to an acoustic phenomenon due to the caliber of the scavenge inlet. Restricting the diameter of the inlet, a counter-intuitive solution, solved that problem.

Notes and references

External links
Detailed Harley Twin Cam Engine Animations

Harley-Davidson engines